Leverett Wright Babcock (1840–1906) was a Minnesota Republican politician and a Speaker of the Minnesota House of Representatives. Babcock, a physician, came to Minnesota in 1879. He served as village council president for Wadena, Minnesota for seven years, and was elected to the Minnesota House of Representatives in 1898. He served three terms, his last as speaker. Babcock died in 1906.

References

1840 births
1906 deaths
Speakers of the Minnesota House of Representatives
Republican Party members of the Minnesota House of Representatives
19th-century American politicians